Pony Express Record is the fifth studio album by American post-hardcore band Shudder to Think, released in 1994 by Epic Records. Although signing to a major label from the independent Dischord Records shocked and alienated some fans of the group, Pony Express Record proved to be a challenging release, mixing diverse musical styles.

Reception

Pony Express Record has received considerable critical acclaim. Greg Prato of AllMusic retrospectively regarded it as "one of the most underrated rock records of the '90s". In 2003, Stylus Magazine writer Deen Freelon wrote that the album was "a jaw-dropping, head-scratching masterpiece back in '94 and remains so today".

Pitchfork placed the album at number 29 on its original 1999 list of the top 100 albums of the 1990s.

Track listing
All songs written by Craig Wedren, except where noted.

PonyExpressRecord.com exclusive MP3s
"Little by Little (vox)"
"Little by Little (no vox)"
"Circus Metal (PXR demo)"
"Kissi Penny (PXR demo)"
"Gang of $ (PXR demo)"
"X-French Tee Shirt (PXR demo)"

Personnel
Personnel per booklet.

 Band
Craig Wedren – lead vocals, guitars
Stuart Hill – bass 
Nathan Larson – guitar 
Adam Wade – drums

Production
 Ted Niceley – production
 Andy Wallace – mixing
 Bob Ludwig – mastering
 Michael Rippe – assistant engineer
 Steve Palmieri – engineer
 Steve Cisco – engineer (mix)
 Will Weems – artwork, photography

References

1994 albums
Epic Records albums
Shudder to Think albums
Albums produced by Ted Niceley